Dimples is a 1916 silent drama film directed by Edgar Jones. The film stars Mary Miles Minter in the lead role.

The film is held by Cinémathèque Française, Paris.

Plot

As described in film magazines, "Dimples" (Minter) is a young girl who lives in a poor tenement with her elderly father, visited only by Horton, her father's simple-minded friend. When Dimples' father dies, Horton discovers the money he has hoarded, which he hides inside a doll, given to Dimples as a gift. Horton then passes away, and Dimples goes to live with her aunt, who runs a boarding house in the South.

A fellow residence of this boarding house is Robert Stanley (Carrigan) who has made his money in cotton. Cotton drops and it looks like he may be ruined, but when a crook who had seen Horton hide the money in the doll makes the journey to Florida to try to steal Dimples' fortune, all is revealed. Dimples uses the money to save Robert from ruin, and they put their money together in the bank under one name.

Cast
 Mary Miles Minter - Dimples
 William Cowper - Her Father
 John J. Donough - Horton
 Thomas Carrigan - Robert Stanley
 Schuyler Ladd - Joseph Langdon
 Peggy Hopkins Joyce - Eugenia Abbott
 Charlotte Shelby - Mrs. Riley

References

External links

1916 films
1916 drama films
Silent American drama films
American silent feature films
American black-and-white films
Films shot in Jacksonville, Florida
Metro Pictures films
1910s American films